Maria Elena Schonbek is an Argentine-American mathematician at the University of California, Santa Cruz. Her research concerns fluid dynamics and associated partial differential equations such as the Navier–Stokes equations.

Education and career
Schonbek received a bachelor's degree from the University of Buenos Aires. She completed her Ph.D. at the University of Michigan in 1976. Her dissertation, Boundary Value Problems for the Fitzhugh–Nagumo Equations, was supervised by Jeffrey Rauch.

Schonbek joined the University of California, Santa Cruz faculty in 1986.
Formerly a professor of mathematics there, she has retired to become a professor emeritus.
At Santa Cruz, Schonbek advocated replacing the campus's system of narrative evaluations of student performance in each course with the more standard system of letter grades used at most other US universities.

Recognition
In 2012, Schonbek became a member of the inaugural class of fellows of the American Mathematical Society.

References

Living people
Argentine mathematicians
Argentine women mathematicians
20th-century American mathematicians
21st-century American mathematicians
American women mathematicians
University of Buenos Aires alumni
University of Michigan alumni
University of California, Santa Cruz faculty
Fellows of the American Mathematical Society
20th-century women mathematicians
21st-century women mathematicians
Year of birth missing (living people)
20th-century American women
21st-century American women